Saša Martinović (born 27 September 1984) is a Croatian professional ice hockey player born in Germany (Croatian diaspora). He is currently playing with Tölzer Löwen in the DEL2. He previously played with the Iserlohn Roosters and the Thomas Sabo Ice Tigers after four seasons with KHL Medveščak of the Kontinental Hockey League (KHL). Martinović previously played for five teams in Deutsche Eishockey Liga.

On 21 April 2017 Martinovic left the Ice Tigers after two seasons as a free agent to sign a one-year deal with the Iserlohn Roosters. Martinovic played with the Roosters for 2 years before leaving as a free agent following the 2018–19 season on 9 March 2019.

On July 1, 2019, Martinovic agreed to continue his career in Germany, signing a one-year deal with DEL2 club, Tölzer Löwen.

Career statistics

Regular season and playoffs

International

References

External links

1984 births
Croatian ice hockey defencemen
ERC Ingolstadt players
ETC Crimmitschau players
German ice hockey defencemen
Grizzlys Wolfsburg players
Hamburg Freezers players
Iserlohn Roosters players
Krefeld Pinguine players
KHL Medveščak Zagreb players
Living people
Thomas Sabo Ice Tigers players
Sportspeople from Füssen